Band-e Majid Khan (also Romanized as Band-e Majīd Khān; also known as Band) is a village in Akhtachi-ye Mahali Rural District, Simmineh District, Bukan County, West Azerbaijan Province, Iran. At the 2006 census, its population was 13, in 5 families.

References 

Populated places in Bukan County